Port Discovery is a "port-of-call" (themed land) at Tokyo DisneySea in the Tokyo Disney Resort. It represents a "marina of the future".

Theming
Port Discovery is themed after a fictional 1940s scientific research centre. The area is home to two fictional societies, 'Center for Weather Control,' and later the 'Marine Life Institute' from Pixar's Finding Dory.

Attractions and entertainment

Current
 Aquatopia
 DisneySea Electric Railway
 Nemo & Friends SeaRider

Former
 StormRider (2001–2016)

Restaurants and refreshments
 Breezeway Bites
 Seaside Snacks
 Horizon Bay Restaurant

Shopping
 Discovery Gifts
 Skywatcher Souvenirs

References

 
Themed areas in Walt Disney Parks and Resorts
Tokyo DisneySea